Nier is a 2010 action role-playing video game, the first in a spin-off series of the Drakengard franchise.

Nier or NIER may also refer to:

Nier 
 Nier: Automata, the 2017 sequel to Nier
 Nier Reincarnation, a 2021 Nier spin-off game for mobile devices

 Alfred O. C. Nier (1911–1994), American physicist
 The Nier Prize in meteoritics, named after him
 A god in the Arcanis, Dungeons & Dragons setting
 Nier (Martian crater), a crater on Mars
 Nier, Alberta, a community in Rocky View

NIER 
 National Institute Economic Review, a British economics journal
 National Institute for Educational Policy Research (NIER), a Japanese national research institute for education sitting within MEXT
 National Institute of Environmental Research, a national research center in Korea

See also 
 Niers